Reid Avenue station may refer to:
 Reid Avenue (BMT Fulton Street Line), a station on the demolished BMT Fulton Street Line
 Reid Avenue (BMT Lexington Avenue Line), a station on the demolished BMT Lexington Avenue Line